St Peter's Catholic College is an independent Roman Catholic co-educational secondary day school, located in the Central Coast suburb of Tuggerah, one hour north of Sydney, New South Wales, Australia. Located in the Roman Catholic Diocese of Broken Bay, the college currently has 1,050 students.

College history

Site origin 

St Peter's Catholic College is within the region of Tuggerah, which according to Aboriginal tradition means savannah, and marshy grassland is evident on the site.

The land, on which the college stands, was owned by the Alison family, a wealthy Scottish family, from 1875 - 1897. The site was purchased by the Diocese of Broken Bay in 1982.

Corpus Christi and Mater Dei amalgamation 

The College has developed through three major building phases since its foundation in 1983. In the beginning, Mater Dei College was built to operate as a Year 7-10 campus for the Catholic community. This was accompanied in 1987 by the progression of a senior campus known as Corpus Christi College. Mater Dei and Corpus Christi Colleges amalgamated in January 2000 to become St Peter’s Catholic College as a Year 7-12 campus.”

Principals

Mater Dei College 
The following individuals have served as College Principal:

Corpus Christi College 
The following individuals have served as College Principal:

St Peter's Catholic College 
The following individuals have served as College Principal:

Alumni

Sportspeople
Athletics
 Rosemary Hayward
Australian rules football
 Jarrad McVeigh
 Mark McVeigh
Baseball
 Chris Snelling 
Netball
 Megan Anderson
 Lauren Moore
Rugby league
 Ryan O'Hara
Soccer
 Damien Brown
 Cassandra Kell

Singers/actors
 Belinda Emmett
 Natalie Imbruglia

Authors
 Ingrid Jonach

References

External links 
 St Peter's Catholic College website
 Diocese of Broken Bay Website

Central Coast (New South Wales)
Catholic secondary schools in New South Wales
1982 establishments in Australia
Educational institutions established in 1982